Final Call (The Lost Tapes) is a previously unreleased studio album by rapper AZ, recorded in 2003 and 2004. It was originally set to be released in 2004 but was shelved because of a two-month early leak on the internet and press. Instead of Final Call the album A.W.O.L. was released in 2005 and included the three songs "Magic Hour", "The Truth" and "Live Wire" of Final Call as bonus tracks. In 2008 Final Call was finally released under AZ's new label Koch Records.

Track listing
Track list according to Amazon

References 

2008 albums
AZ (rapper) albums
Albums produced by Da Beatminerz
Albums produced by Buckwild
E1 Music albums